Nižná Jablonka is a village and municipality in Humenné District in the Prešov Region of north-east Slovakia.

History
The village was first mentioned in historical records in 1436.

Geography
It has a population of about 180 people.

References

External links
 
 
Statistics

Villages and municipalities in Humenné District